The Tuo Koto Nan Ampek Mosque, also known as Gadang Balai Nan Duo Mosque is one of the oldest mosques in Indonesia located in Koto Nan Ampek Nagari, now administratively included into the area of Balai Nan Duo village, West Payakumbuh District, city of Payakumbuh, West Sumatera. The Minangkabau architecture is thought to have been built in 1840, which was originally covered with fiber roofs before being replaced with zinc. Currently other than being used for Muslim worship activities, this single-level mosque is also used by the surrounding community as a means of religious education.

History 
It is not known when exactly the mosque was begun building. According to an author Abdul Baqir Zein in his book entitled Historical Mosques in Indonesia, the mosque was estimated to be built in 1840 and named after its establishment, Koto Nan Ampek Nagari. The construction was led by three different leaders from respective tribes in Minangkabau: Datuk Kuniang from the Kampai tribe, Datuk Pangkai Sinaro from Piliang tribe, and Datuk Siri Dirajo from Malayu tribe.

Although it is one of the oldest mosques, most of the masts, floors, and walls made of wood have never been replaced since the first time the mosque was built. The mosque hasn't undergone many renovations thus its authenticity is still maintained. Because of erosion, however, the roof which was originally made from fibers was then replaced with zinc.

See also 

 List of mosques in Indonesia

References 
 Footnotes

 Bibliography

 
 
 
 
 
 
 

Buildings and structures in West Sumatra
Cultural Properties of Indonesia in West Sumatra
Minangkabau
Mosques in Indonesia
Religious buildings and structures completed in 1840
Tourist attractions in West Sumatra